The Novocherkassk massacre was a massacre which was committed by the Soviet army and KGB against unarmed civilians who were rallying on 2 June 1962 in the Soviet city of Novocherkassk. A few weeks prior to the massacre, workers at the Electro Locomotive Novocherkassk plant (NEVZ) had organized a peaceful labor strike which later resulted in bloodshed and the killing of about 26 people.

On January 1, 1962, the wages at the NEVZ were lowered by 30–35%. At the same time, the production quotas which were set up for workers as a part of the Soviet Union's planned economy were raised. These events also coincided with a sharp nationwide increase in the prices of dairy and meat products (up to 35% according to one account), raising them above the budget of many workers. Protesters gathered near the city's central administrative building did not disperse when ordered by the surrounding Soviet troops, who then opened fire, killing 26 and wounding 87, including children.

Arrests, show trials and cover-ups ensued: about 240 were arrested, seven people were convicted of various crimes such as "mass disorder" and sentenced to death and hundreds of others were imprisoned for up to 15 years (though the prison terms of some were later reduced). News of the events never appeared in the state-controlled press and the Soviet government continued to conceal it until April 27, 1991; however, it was described in a few underground samizdat publications. The 26 dead were secretly buried by KGB operatives in secret graves which were not disclosed to relatives and friends until June 2, 1994, when almost all bodies were discovered and reburied at the official memorial.

In 1992, shortly after the dissolution of the Soviet Union, the events were investigated by the Chief Military Prosecutor's Office. The major suspects among the highest-ranking Soviet officials such as Nikita Khrushchev, Anastas Mikoyan, Frol Kozlov and several others who were deemed responsible for the massacre had died by the time of the investigation. Each year, the massacre is commemorated on its anniversary by a group of surviving participants. Some of the victims of the massacre were symbolically compensated for their illegal imprisonment and deaths. In 1990, a museum was dedicated to the victims of the massacre next to the square where it took place.

History

The riots were a direct result of shortages of food and provisions, as well as the poor working conditions in the factory. The protest began on June 1 in the Budyonny Electric Locomotive Factory, when workers from the foundry and forge shops stopped work after factory management refused to hear their complaints. The strike and attendant discussions had spread throughout the whole factory by noon.

The unrest began when Nikita Khrushchev announced an increase in the prices of meat and butter throughout the Soviet Union on June 1. On the same day, as required by a separate economic plan, the minimum production quotas for each worker at the factory were increased, thereby effectively reducing pay rates; some protestors called Khrushchev a "False Leninist" and compared his policies unfavorably with the annual price-reduction regime of Joseph Stalin. These tensions culminated in a march on the town hall and police headquarters, and the strike spread to other enterprises after police arrested thirty workers.

According to documents declassified in the 1990s, motorised infantry units were called to suppress the protesters, but they fired in the air; the lethal fire came from a unit of Internal troops from Rostov-on-Don, composed of 10 snipers and 2 machine guns, firing from the "Don" hotel. Orders to kill were passed through the whole chain of command from Khrushchev via the ministry of defense.

The commander of the North-Caucasian Troops, general Matvey Kuzmich Shapochnikov, refused to execute an order to attack peaceful demonstrators with tanks (he reportedly said, "I don't see any enemy that we could turn our weapons against"), for which he was later degraded, brutally beaten and arrested by the secret state security police.

Victims 
According to now available official sources, 26 protesters were machine-gunned and killed by Soviet troops. An additional 87 protesters were wounded, three of them mortally. Due to Soviet propaganda at that time the protesters trusted the goodwill of the Soviet army, and many did not expect them to fire live ammunition at unarmed citizens. After the initial demonstrations, a curfew was imposed on the city and the dead were secretly buried in cemeteries scattered across the Rostov Oblast. However, a group of several hundred demonstrators gathered in the square again the following morning. 116 of them were arrested, and fourteen were convicted in show trials. Seven of those convicted received a death sentence, and the others were sentenced to prison terms ranging from ten to fifteen years.

Following the incident, the Soviet government directed extra food supplies to the region and began an investigation. Additional workers were arrested, and several military officials involved in the incident were court martialed.

The story was hushed-up by Soviet media and remained an official secret until 1992, a year after the fall of the Soviet Union. At that time the remains of 20 protesters were recovered, identified, and buried in the Novoshakhtinsk cemetery.

Aftermath 
On August 19, 1962, the trials began. About 110 people were charged with breaking Article 77 and 79 of the RSFSR Penal Code. The defendants, identified using photos taken by KGB agents, were charged with banditry, mass disorder, and attempt to overthrow the Soviet State. Soviet Militia officers were used as "eyewitnesses" to fabricate cases despite being directly involved in attempts to disperse the strike. Many defendants were sentenced to 5 to 12 years in prison. The Supreme Court of the RSFSR, chaired by L.N. Smirnov with help of prosecutor A.A Kruglov, sentenced 7 people (out of 14 charged) to death:
 Zaytsev Alexander Fyodorovich ( b. 1927)
 Korkach Andrey Andreevich ( b. 1917)
 Kuznetsov Michael Alexandrovich ( b. 1930)
 Mokrousov Boris Nikolaevich ( b. 1923)
 Sotnikov Sergey Sergeevich ( b. 1937)
 Cherepanov Vladimir Dmitrievich ( b. 1933)
 Shuvaev Vladimir Georgievich ( b. 1937)
The trials continued until September 1962.

Investigation

Siuda report 

Himself the son of a Bolshevik killed in 1937 during the Great Purge, Siuda was sentenced to 12 years imprisonment in September 1962, but was freed in the spring of 1965. In prison, with help from his mother, he gathered information on the victims and events of the rally, and compiled a list of 104 convicts. His information was first published in the 1980s in underground publications known as samizdat, . After being freed from prison, he was constantly harassed by the KGB for his dissenting behavior and publications. In an interview in the early 90s, he reported that the 1980s Soviet militia (civil police) used semi-legal groups of ex-convicts (similar to titushky) to harass dissenters such as himself.

He notes that the Novocherkassk massacre did not become widely known because the victims and observers were terrorized into silence by the KGB and the Communist Party. In 1979, he publicly condemned the Soviet Invasion of Afghanistan. Piotr died under suspicious circumstances, which his spouse Emma called a political murder and attributed to his reporting on Novocherkassk. He died days after reporting a discovery of an eyewitness, an excavator operator, who told him where the massacre victims were buried; he had also received a phone call in which someone had told him that he would not survive the 28th anniversary of the massacre.

Official investigation 
With the first signs of Soviet Union's disintegration in 1989, the freshly elected Soviet Supreme Council initiated an investigation into the massacre. A group of activists, journalists, and a few local volunteers established a Novocherkassk Massacre Foundation to find, help, and compensate the victims, and conduct further investigation into the crime.

On May 18, 1992, the newly created Presidium of the Supreme Soviet of the RSFSR officially condemned the massacre and instructed the General Prosecutor's office to review all fabricated criminal cases against the victims. It also offered the Government to pay restitution of 25,000 rubles to the victims.

Timeline

May 
 1–7 May: According to V. A. Kozlov, the first signs of discontent among workers were expressed long before the massacre happened. The first isolated cases of individual strikes at the Electro Locomotive Novocherkassk plant (NEVZ) were recorded. It was claimed that among the strikers were many experienced political prisoners who were previously repressed by the Soviet regime, but this is not supported by any evidence.
 17 May: The Council of Ministers issued decree No. 456, which declared a nationwide increase in the price of various items planned to come into effect on June 1.
 May 31: The first news of the No. 456 decree appeared in the Soviet press.; as strike was already going on, at some point V. I. Chernykh and his comrade factory painter V.D. Koroteev made a sign which read the following: "Give us meat and butter" and "We need apartments!".

June 
 June 1: The size of protest kept growing. At this time the strikers were harassed by Soviet army personnel, soviet militsiya with various clashes between them and the protesters, who attempted to spark strikes in other factories around NEBF; on the evening a commander of the North Caucasus Military District at the time, Issa Pliyev, had refused to attack demonstrants.
 June 2: The strike over the NEBF continued overnight. In the early morning thousands marched from NEBF toward Novocherkassk's centre carrying portraits of Lenin and red flags; they were heading toward buildings of the city's council and executive committee; though disorganised at this point the crowd was calm and peaceful. The crowd crossed the bridge spanning the Tuzlov river and was met by tanks commanded by Colonel Matvey Shaposhnikov who refused to open fire at the people; at the time many members of the CC of the CPSU, KGB, MIA and other high officials had already arrived and were present in the city. By the time the crowd reached the centre of the city authorities learned that they had passed the bridge unopposed; consequently deciding to quickly retreat into safety. As the march continued to advance toward the centre, more people started to join the crowd, frightening the authorities further; about 4,000 people gathered on the streets. children, among which was Alexander Lebed, witnessed the marching movement; the crowd attacked and looted several administrative buildings and police stations, sparking brief violence; demands to Mikoyan to come out and speak to people followed. At midday the army attempted to disperse the crowd using soldiers and armoured personnel carriers but failed and shortly after fired at the people, claiming the lives of 22 and wounding many others, including soldiers. On the evening of the same day, two protesters were killed according to officials.
 June 2–3: A curfew was imposed and lasted more than a week; Protests continued though at smaller scale.
 June 3–4: Overnight about 240 people were arrested; the same day a vice head of the Investigative Committee of KGB D. F. Shebetenko had initiated an investigation into a violation of the Article 79 of the RSFSR Penal Code 
 June 4; the demonstrations dwindled; due to the state of fear many of those who had participated in demonstrations decided to turn themselves over to KGB; some of workers even were trying to appease local administration by offering to work overtime on Sunday.

July 
 19 July: Some of the protesters were sentenced to ten years in prison.

October 
 19 October: A report about rumours of the massacre appeared in Time magazine.

Legacy 
In the early 1990s a museum was opened in the building next to a square where demonstrants were killed. It showed at least 36 photos of people taken by KGB that were used during fake trials as "evidence" of protesters identities. In 2009 the museum, that was maintained by efforts of a few victims and volunteers, was handed over to the Museum of the History of the Don Cossacks. The museum has a stand with photos of victims and events copied from photos taken in 1962 by KGB that were declassifed in early 90s.

Movies 
During a Politburo scene in The Devil's Alternative by Frederick Forsyth, the KGB chief, asked if he could suppress riots during famine, responds that the KGB could suppress ten, even twenty Novocherkassks, but not fifty; intentionally using the example to highlight the seriousness of the threat in the novel.

The massacre is dramatised in Francis Spufford's 2010 novel Red Plenty.

The films Once upon a time in Rostov (2012) and Dear Comrades (2020) offer depictions of the massacre.

See also

 Human rights in the Soviet Union
 Kengir uprising
 List of food riots
 List of massacres in the Soviet Union
 Vorkuta uprising (1953)
 Warning strike in Poland (1981)

Notes

References

External links
 The Novocherkassk Tragedy, June 1–3 1962 (Archived, Feb 22, 2017, EN) – An eyewitness account of the strike leading up to the shootings.
 Novocherkassk tragedy: half-century later (Archived, Dec 31, 2017, RU) – A local newspaper publication commemorating events, May 2012

Mass murder in 1962
1962 riots
1962 protests
1962 in Russia
Massacres in 1962
June 1962 events in Europe
Massacres in the Soviet Union
Soviet cover-ups
Riots and civil disorder in the Soviet Union
Food riots
Massacres committed by the Soviet Union
Protests in the Soviet Union
Protest-related deaths
Novocherkassk
Protests in Russia
Riots and civil disorder in Russia
1962 murders in the Soviet Union